is a railway station of JR Kyushu Nippō Main Line in Aira, Kagoshima, Japan.

Lines 
Kyushu Railway Company
Nippō Main Line

JR

Adjacent stations

Nearby places
Shigetomi Post office

Railway stations in Japan opened in 1901
Railway stations in Kagoshima Prefecture